Hélène Pelletier (born January 2, 1959) is a Canadian former professional tennis player.

Biography
Born in Charlesbourg, Pelletier showed talent in water skiing as a child and only took up tennis at the age of 14. She trained for a short time at the Hopman Academy in Florida before injuring her ankle and played tennis for Rollins College.

In 1979 she won a Pan American Games silver medal in women's doubles and a mixed doubles bronze at the Summer Universiade in Mexico City.

Pelletier played a total of 12 Federation Cup ties for Canada, from 1981 to 1985.

She was most prominent on the professional tour as a doubles player, often partnering Federation Cup teammate Jill Hetherington, with whom she won the 1984 Brasil Open in Rio de Janeiro and made the round of 16 at the 1984 French Open. The pair's biggest win was over Martina Navratilova and Gigi Fernández at the 1985 Virginia Slims of Florida.

As a singles player, her achievements including qualifying for the main draw of the 1984 Wimbledon Championships. She defeated Liz Smylie at the 1984 edition of the Canadian Open and won a Federation Cup match against Britain's Anne Hobbs in the same year.

Retiring due to injury in 1986, Pelletier went on to have a career in media. She started at radio station CKAC and since 1989 has been with Quebec sports broadcaster Réseau des sports (RDS).

WTA career titles

Doubles (1)

See also
 List of Canada Fed Cup team representatives

References

External links
 
 
 

1959 births
Living people
Canadian female tennis players
Racket sportspeople from Quebec
Sportspeople from Quebec City
Rollins Tars women's tennis players
Canadian television hosts
Universiade medalists in tennis
Pan American Games medalists in tennis
Pan American Games silver medalists for Canada
Tennis players at the 1979 Pan American Games
Canadian women television hosts
Universiade bronze medalists for Canada
Medalists at the 1979 Summer Universiade
Medalists at the 1979 Pan American Games
20th-century Canadian women